Bahreman (also Romanized as Bahremān; also known as Bāhermūn and Bahrmun) is a city and capital of Nuq District, in Rafsanjan County, Kerman Province, Iran.  At the 2006 census, its population was 4,405, in 1,109 families.

Former Iranian president, Akbar Hashemi Rafsanjani was born in Bahreman.

References

Populated places in Rafsanjan County

Cities in Kerman Province